Rafael Martín (12 September 1914 – 22 April 2010) was a Spanish basketball player. A 1.85 m tall small forward, he was the EuroBasket 1935 MVP, as he helped lead the Spanish national team to a silver medal.

External links
 FIBA.com Profile
 Fibaeurope.com Profile

1914 births
2010 deaths
Spanish men's basketball players